Level Europe GmbH was an Austrian airline owned by Vueling, and by extension the International Airlines Group (IAG). It operated short-haul flights within Europe from bases at Amsterdam Airport Schiphol and Vienna International Airport sharing the Level's brand, but at the same time, being completely different airlines. The airline's first flight took place on 17 July 2018. The airline filed for insolvency on 18 June 2020, and ceased operations on the same day.

History

The airline was founded as Anisec Luftfahrt in November 2017 as a subsidiary of Spanish airline Vueling, originally with intended plans to operate flights from Vienna International Airport under the "Vueling Austria" brand if IAG was successful in acquiring defunct airline Niki and its assets. On 28 June 2018, IAG announced that the subsidiary would operate four Airbus A321 aircraft previously used by Air Berlin under the Level brand, as opposed to the "Vueling Austria" brand as first planned, and would later launch 14 destinations from Vienna from 17 July 2018 through 13 August 2018.

On 14 March 2019, IAG announced plans to use the airline to open a new base at Amsterdam Airport Schiphol beginning from 6 April 2019, with seven routes and three Airbus A320 aircraft to be transferred from Vueling, its parent company, between March and August 2019. In late December 2019, the airline's name was changed from Anisec Luftfahrt to Level Europe.

In March 2020, Level Europe's fleet was grounded and its operations were suspended due to the COVID-19 pandemic and its effects on air travel demand. Before operations were able to resume, the airline announced on 18 June 2020 that it would cease business operations with immediate effect and enter insolvency.

Destinations

At the time of the airline's closure, it operated to 18 destinations on behalf of the Level brand.

Fleet

At the time Level Europe ceased operations in June 2020, its fleet consisted of the following aircraft:

Frequent-flyer program
Short-haul flights operated by Level Europe did not earn Avios points on any frequent-flyer program affiliated with IAG's airlines.

References

External links

Defunct airlines of Austria
Airlines established in 2017
Airlines disestablished in 2020
Companies based in Vienna
International Airlines Group
2020 disestablishments in Austria
Austrian companies established in 2017
Airlines disestablished due to the COVID-19 pandemic